Eva Krejčová (born 12 November 1976) is a former professional tennis player from the Czech Republic.

Biography
Born in Rokycany, Krejčová is the only child of Ilona and Zbynen. At the age of 10 she was introduced to tennis by her father.

Krejčová, a right-handed player, made her WTA Tour main draw debut at the Prague Open in 1993 and was beaten in the first round by Germany's Silke Frankl.

In 1994 she won the first of her five ITF singles titles, at Staré Splavy in her home country.

A regular competitor in the qualifying events of grand slam tournaments, including 10 in a row between 2000 and 2002, she was never able to make a main draw.

She retired from professional tennis after the 2002 US Open qualifying tournament.

ITF finals

Singles (5–5)

Doubles (2–4)

References

External links
 
 

1976 births
Living people
Czech female tennis players
People from Rokycany
Sportspeople from the Plzeň Region